Spetsai (Greek: Θ/Κ Σπέτσαι) was a Greek ironclad battleship of the  that served in the Royal Hellenic Navy from 1890 until 1920. She was named after the Saronic Gulf island of Spetses, which played a key role in the war at sea during the Greek War of Independence. Spetsai she was ordered in 1885 in response to a crisis in the Balkans and Ottoman naval expansion. The ship was launched in 1889 and delivered to Greece by 1902.

Spetsai and her sisters saw extensive service with the Greek Navy. They participated in the Greco–Turkish War in 1897 until the Great Powers intervened and prevented the Greek Navy from capitalizing on their superiority over the Ottoman Navy. Psara saw action in the First Balkan War at the Naval Battle of Elli and was present at the Naval Battle of Lemnos, but was too slow to actively engage the Ottoman forces.

Design

She displaced  as built.

Spetsais main battery consisted of three  guns in individual mounts. Two guns were mounted forward in barbettes on either side of the forward superstructure; these were L/34 guns. The third gun, a L/28 gun, was placed in a turret aft. The secondary battery consisted of four  L/36 guns in casemates were mounted below the forward main battery, and a fifth 5.9-inch gun was placed on the centerline on the same deck as the main battery. A number of smaller guns were carried for defense against torpedo boats. These included four  L/22 guns, four 3-pounder guns, four 1-pounder guns, and six 1-pounder Hotchkiss revolver cannons. The ship was also armed with three  torpedo tubes, one on each broadside and one in the bow.

The ship was armored with a mix of Creusot and compound steel. The main battery barbettes were protected by up to 14 inches of armor.

Service history
Spetsai was ordered from the Société Nouvelle des Forges et Chantiers de la Méditerranée shipyard in Le Havre, France, during the premiership of Charilaos Trikoupis.

Spetsai saw limited action in the Greco–Turkish War in 1897, as the Royal Hellenic Navy was unable to make use of its superiority over the Ottoman Navy. The Ottoman Navy had remained in port during the conflict, but a major naval intervention of the Great Powers prevented the Greeks from capitalizing on their superiority. The conflict was centered on the island of Crete, which was the object of an international naval demonstration in 1897–1898; the Great Powers mediated a solution to the conflict that saw Crete returned to Ottoman control, but with a Greek prince. In 1897–1900, Spetsai and her sister-ships were partially rearmed; Spetsai was modified at the La Seyne shipyard. Their small-caliber guns were replaced with one  gun forward, eight  guns, four 3-pounders, and ten 1-pounder revolver cannons. One of the 14-inch torpedo tubes was replaced with a  weapon. In 1908–1910, the old 5.9 in guns were replaced with new, longer L/45 models.

The Balkan League, of which Greece was a member, declared war on the Ottoman Empire in October 1912. Two months later, the Ottoman fleet attacked the Greek navy, in an attempt to disrupt the naval blockade surrounding the Dardanelles. The smaller ships remained at the mouth of the straits while the battleships sailed north, remaining near to the coast. The Greek flotilla, which included the armored cruiser  and Spetsai and her sisters, had been sailing from the island of Imbros to the patrol line outside the straits. When the Ottomans were sighted, the Greeks altered course to the northeast in order to block the advance of their opponents. At 10:04, the Ottoman ships completed a 16-point turn, which reversed their course, and steamed for the safety of the straits in a disorganized withdrawal. Within an hour, the routed Ottoman ships had withdrawn into the Dardanelles.

The Naval Battle of Lemnos resulted from an Ottoman plan to lure the faster Georgios Averof away from the Dardanelles. The protected cruiser  evaded the Greek blockade and broke out into the Aegean Sea; the assumption was that the Greeks would dispatch Georgios Averof to hunt down Hamidiye. Despite the threat to Greek lines of communication posed by the cruiser, the Greek commander refused to detach Georgios Averof from her position. She scored several hits on the fleeing Ottoman ships before breaking off the chase. Spetsai and her sisters were too slow to keep up with Georgios Averof, and played no active part in the engagement.

At the outbreak of World War I at the end of July 1914, Greece's pro-German monarch, Constantine I, decided to remain neutral. The Entente powers landed troops in Salonika in 1915, which was a source of tension between France and Greece. Ultimately, the French seized the Greek Navy on 19 October 1916; the heavy units of the Greek fleet were disarmed and placed in reserve for the remainder of the war. Spetsai was decommissioned in 1920 and used as a naval communications school until 1929, when she was broken up for scrap.

Footnotes

References
 
 
 
 
 
 
 
 
 
 
 

Hydra-class ironclads
1889 ships
Ships built in France
Military units and formations of Greece in the Balkan Wars